Garden City High School is a public high school located in Garden City, Texas (USA) and classified as a 1A school by the UIL.  It is part of the Glasscock County Independent School District located in central Glasscock County.  Garden City High School was recognized as one of 25 Blue Ribbon Schools in the state of Texas for 2011.   In 2015, the school was rated "Met Standard" by the Texas Education Agency.

Athletics
The Garden City Bearkats compete in these sports - 

Cross Country, 6-Man Football, Basketball, Golf, Tennis & Track

State Titles
Football - 
2009(6M/D1), 2010(6M/D1)
Girls Track - 
1975(B)
 Boys Golf
 2018, 2019

State Finalists
Girls Basketball - 
2007(1A/D1)

Academics
UIL Academic Meet Champions 
2006(1A)

References

External links
Glasscock County ISD
List of Six-man football stadiums in Texas

Public high schools in Texas
Public middle schools in Texas